is a train station in Kushima, Miyazaki Prefecture, Japan.

Lines

Layout 
The station consists of two side platforms serving two tracks at grade. The station building is a simple wooden structure in Japanese style with a tile roof. It is unstaffed and serves only as a waiting room. Access to the opposite side platform is by means of a level crossing. A bike shed is available at the station forecourt.

Adjacent stations

History
The line was then extended northwards in phases. The first major phase of expansion added 28.5 km of track and several stations, reaching Yowara, which opened as the new northern terminus on 15 April 1935. Hyūga-Ōtsuka was one of the intermediate stations which opened on the same day. On 8 May 1963, the route was designated the Nichinan Line on 8 May 1963. With the privatization of Japanese National Railways (JNR), the successor of JGR, on 1 April 1987, the station came under the control of JR Kyushu.

Passenger statistics
In fiscal 2016, the station was used by an average of 24 passengers (boarding only) per day.

See also
List of railway stations in Japan

References

External links
Hyūga-Ōtsuka (JR Kyushu)

Railway stations in Miyazaki Prefecture
Railway stations in Japan opened in 1935